Johannes C. Kolderman Jr. (June 29, 19181989) was a Michigan politician.

Early life
Kolderman was born on June 29, 1918 in Grand Rapids, Michigan.

Career
Kolderman was appointed to the position of mayor of Wyoming, Michigan in 1959 following the resignation of his predecessor, William Doorn. He served in this position until 1962. On November 8, 1966, Kolderman was elected to the Michigan House of Representatives where he represented the 94th district from January 11, 1967 to December 31, 1968. Kolderman was not re-elected in 1968.

Personal life
Kolderman was married and had two children.

Death
Kolderman died in 1989.

References

1918 births
1989 deaths
Mayors of places in Michigan
Politicians from Grand Rapids, Michigan
People from Wyoming, Michigan
Republican Party members of the Michigan House of Representatives
20th-century American politicians